Kimberly Brooks is an American artist and author. Her work blends figuration and abstraction with a focus on subjects related to memory, reality, history, representation, and identity.

Early life and education
Born in New York City as Kimberly Shlain, she is the daughter of Leonard Shlain and Carol (nee)Lewis. She grew up in Mill Valley, California. There she studied sculpture, drawing, and painting as a child.  She attended UC Berkeley and earned a Bachelor of Arts degree in literature. Following her graduation, she spent a year in Paris and attended the Sorbonne. She later studied painting at UCLA and Otis College of Art and Design.

Work

Painting and multimedia
Brooks' first solo exhibition, The Whole Story,  was held at the Risk Press Gallery in Los Angeles in 2006. It featured a series of "rich, segmented" paintings which investigated the role of women as artists and models. Brooks used erotic imagery and fragmentation to examine the historical glorification of women's bodies to present the female image within a feminist representation. 

Brooks' second solo show, Mom's Friends, explored the feminism of the early 1960s and 1970s.  The paintings in the exhibit were based on her mother and her friends in Marin County, California. In addition to original photographs, Brooks shot recreations, using friends and models in vintage clothing. Leah Lehmbeck in The Huffington Post wrote:  "Brooks creates an aesthetic of memory through the familiar, carefully framed, high contrast visions found in a photo album." Valli Herman of the Los Angeles Times wrote: "Brooks explores issues of feminine identity, nostalgia, and womanhood in a series of oil and gouache portraits based on photos of her mother and her fashionable 1970s friends from Brooks’ Mill Valley, California childhood."

Mom's Friends was followed by Technicolor Summer in 2008.  Brooks began work on Technicolor Summer after her father was diagnosed with a terminal illness. She wrote: "Every moment was more vivid because it could be the last one. It was a summer in high definition. A summer in technicolor." "As viewers, we have to disentangle the seeming realism of the scene itself from Brooks’ representation of it," Kim Biel wrote in ArtLTD. "Central to this project is the fact that Brooks’ paintings don't pretend to be absolutely transparent windows on reality; instead, they reproduce the peculiar material qualities of old photographs."

After attending a talk at LACMA about Elsa Schiaparelli's and Coco Chanel's influence on the paintings of Henri Matisse, Brooks began a project creating portraits of well-known costume and fashion designers, and stylists, titled The Style Project. It challenged the viewer to "think about the meaning of personal style and question who is ultimately responsible for trends that take off in popular fashion." Brooks photographed her subjects in their own environments and then painted from the photographs. She continued to address questions about female beauty and fashion through more abstract portraiture with Thread in 2011, described as a "post-apocalyptic fashion show." In 2014, she had two solo shows, I See People Disappear and I Have A King Who Does Not Speak. 

In 2015, Brooks' 8-foot-tall uncoated steel pendant, "The Ephemerality of Manner," was permanently acquired by the Cooper Building in Los Angeles' Fashion District. Using video, collage work, textile pieces, and welded steel, it was created as part of her site-specific installation "Thread and Bone."  The Los Angeles Times wrote that the sculpture was "shot through with subtle complexities and contradictions traversing fashion, feminism, architecture and art history."

In September 2017, the Zevitas Marcus Gallery in Los Angeles presented Brazen, a solo exhibition of paintings Brooks began working on after the 2016 American presidential election. Brooks used silver and gold leaf for the first time to create "aggressively abstract" paintings that incorporate religious icons, grand interiors and ornamentation "purposefully untethered from their traditional functions and allowed to embody a greater range of meaning within our contemporary culture."Art and Cake wrote:  "Conceptual and abstract, this mediation of the art historical discourse speaks to the necessity for the value to be unprecious, for pretense and privilege to be openly critiqued, for the eye of the artist to outweigh the conventional taste — to be both beautiful and brazen inside a modern algorithm of beauty, eccentricity, individuality, and engagement."

Teaching, writing, speaking
Between 2007 and 2009, Brooks interviewed artists and contributed more than 70 essays about art for First Person Artist, her weekly column in The Huffington Post. She founded the Huffington Post Arts section in 2010 and its Science section in 2011. In 2011, she presented "The Creative Process in Eight Stages" at a TEDx conference.

Personal life
Brooks lives in Los Angeles, and works out of a studio in Venice, California. She and her husband, Albert Brooks married in 1997. Together they have two children; a son and a daughter. Following her father's death, Brooks and her siblings, Tiffany Shlain and Jordan Shlain, worked together to edit the manuscript of his final book, Leonardo's Brain: Understanding Da Vinci's Creative Genius.

Solo exhibitions, publications and installations
 2018 Brazen: A Painting and Poetry Collection, Edited by Keith Martin. Poets Brandon Constantine, Richard Ferguson, Luivette Resto and Marie Marandola contribute poems inspired by paintings of Kimberly Brooks. Published by Griffith Moon.
 2018 Mid Career Survey, Mt San Antonio College, Walnut, CA
 2015 Thread and Bone, the Cooper Building, Los Angeles, California 
 2014 I Have A King Who Does Not Speak Roosevelt Library, San Antonio, Texas

References

External links
 

Year of birth missing (living people)
American women painters
Living people
Otis College of Art and Design alumni
People from Mill Valley, California
UC Berkeley College of Letters and Science alumni
University of California, Los Angeles alumni
Painters from New York City
21st-century American women artists
21st-century American painters